María Camila Zárate Mahecha (Bogotá, July 11, 1987) is a Colombian actress who debuted in El penúltimo beso. She also participated in telenovelas like Chepe Fortuna and Rafael Orozco, el ídolo. In 2013 she starred with Marianela Gonzalez on soap opera Sweet love on Caracol TV.

Biography
Camila was born in Bogotá, Colombia, on July 11, 1987. She started her career on Colombian television.

At 18 she began working as Locutura on major radio stations such as Top 40, (The Mega) and later as host of The Notebook of Channel 13 and Nickneim and hake Zone of City Tv. She debuted in 2009 as an actress in The penultimate kiss, where she got her first starring role with Noelia Fernández Santamaría.

On Chepe Fortuna, she played the ambitious Herlinda Fortuna. Initially she was cast as the title role, but Camila rejected the proposal because she wanted to prepare more professionally. Her first international project was with the MTV in the series Popland!. In 2013 she returned as protagonist in the Colombian version of the Argentinian novel Duce Amor where Veronica Toledo plays a very controversial figure.

Home
Her acting career was thanks to the director who chose her to play Herney Moon in  El penúltimo beso in 2009 and Noelia, next to Sebastian Martinez.

Television

See also
 Taliana Vargas
 Javier Jattin
 Sebastián Martínez (actor)

References

External links
 Colarte page
 
 

1987 births
Colombian television actresses
Living people
Actresses from Bogotá
Colombian telenovela actresses
21st-century Colombian actresses